Anisopodus costaricensis is a species of beetle in the family Cerambycidae that was described by Lara & Shenefelt in 1964.

References

Anisopodus
Beetles described in 1964